Broadway Market Building was a historic commercial building located at Asheville, Buncombe County, North Carolina. It was built about 1916, and was a two-story building constructed of hand-pressed panel-face concrete block with beveled edges. The building has been demolished.

It was listed on the National Register of Historic Places in 2003.

References

Commercial buildings on the National Register of Historic Places in North Carolina
Commercial buildings completed in 1916
Buildings and structures in Asheville, North Carolina
National Register of Historic Places in Buncombe County, North Carolina